Ted Dwane (born Edward James Milton Dwane, 15 August 1984) is a British musician and photographer, best known for being the bassist of the Grammy Award-winning British folk rock band Mumford & Sons. Before this he was the bassist in experimental folk band Moulettes.

Music career
Dwane is a founding member of the British folk band Mumford & Sons. He plays the double bass, bass guitar, drums, guitar and provides backing vocals. Dwane performed with two of his current band members, Marcus Mumford and Winston Marshall, with Laura Marling before Mumford & Sons.

Photography
Dwane is a keen photographer and has a photography blog on the Mumford & Sons website.
Dwane held his first solo photography exhibition, A Show of Faces, from 16 to 24 November 2013 in Shoreditch, London.

Health
On 31 May 2013, whilst performing at the Greek Theatre Berkeley, Dwane had an acute subdural haematoma which went undiagnosed for over a week. Dwane went on to perform six gigs before finally being correctly diagnosed and treated in Austin on 11 June. He was discharged on 13 June after a successful operation. Mumford & Sons had to cancel three performances in America including the 2013 Bonnaroo Music Festival so Dwane could fully recover. Touring for the band resumed three weeks later for their headline slot at Glastonbury Festival.

References

1984 births
Living people
British folk guitarists
British male guitarists
British rock bass guitarists
British rock drummers
British male drummers
Mumford & Sons members
Grammy Award winners
People educated at Millfield
Male bass guitarists
People educated at Windlesham House School
21st-century drummers
21st-century English bass guitarists
21st-century British male musicians